Naimabad (also Romanized as Na‘īmābād) is a village in Damankuh Rural District, in the Central District of Damghan County, Semnan Province, Iran. At the 2006 census, its population was 155, in 62 families.

Most of the people in this village are farmers and the main product is pistachios.

References 

Populated places in Damghan County